The 1976 Roller Hockey World Cup was the twenty-second roller hockey world cup, organized by the Fédération Internationale de Roller Sports. It was contested by 12 national teams (6 from Europe, 2 from South America, 2 from Oceania, 1 from North America and 1 from Asia). All the games were played in the city of Oviedo, in Spain, the chosen city to host the World Cup.

Results

Standings

See also
 FIRS Roller Hockey World Cup

External links
 1976 World Cup in rink-hockey.net historical database

Roller Hockey World Cup
International roller hockey competitions hosted by Spain
1976 in Spanish sport
1976 in roller hockey